Pontbuiten is a resort in Suriname, located in the Paramaribo District.  Its population at the 2012 census was 23,211.

Pontbuiten was founded in the mid 20th century by the Pont family, and was intended for agriculture.

References

Resorts of Suriname
Populated places in Paramaribo District